Curtis Campher (born 20 April 1999) is a South African-born Irish cricketer who plays for the Ireland cricket team and Munster Reds. Campher made his international debut for Ireland in June 2020. In October 2021, Campher became the first bowler for Ireland to take a hat-trick in a Twenty20 International (T20I) match, going on to take four wickets in four balls, becoming one of three fast bowlers to pull that feat off he would later be joined by Lasith Malinga of Sri Lanka cricket team and Jason Holder of the West Indies Cricket Team]]

Career
Campher has dual citizenship; he held an Irish passport prior to his selection for Ireland, and qualified to play for the Ireland cricket team through his grandmother. He had also played for the South Africa under-19 cricket team in the past.

In February 2020, he was added to the Ireland Wolves team for their tour to Namibia. He made his Twenty20 debut on 21 February 2020, and his List A debut on 26 February 2020, both for Ireland Wolves against Namibia, during their tour to South Africa.

On 10 July 2020, Campher was named in Ireland's 21-man squad to travel to England to start training behind closed doors for the One Day International (ODI) series against the England cricket team. On 28 July 2020, Cricket Ireland named Campher in their 14-man squad for the first ODI of the series. He made his ODI debut for Ireland, against England, on 30 July 2020. Campher top-scored for Ireland in the match with 59 not out, but they went on to lose by six wickets.

In February 2021, Campher was named in the Ireland Wolves' squad for their tour to Bangladesh. Campher made his first-class debut on 26 February 2021, for Ireland Wolves against the Bangladesh Emerging team.

In August 2021, Campher was named in Ireland's Twenty20 International (T20I) squad for their series against Zimbabwe. Campher made his T20I debut on 27 August 2021, for Ireland against Zimbabwe. In September 2021, Campher was named in Ireland's provisional squad for the 2021 ICC Men's T20 World Cup. On 18 October 2021, in Ireland's first match of the T20 World Cup, against the Netherlands, Campher became the first bowler for Ireland to take a hat-trick in T20I cricket. Campher also became the third bowler, after Lasith Malinga and Rashid Khan, to take four wickets in four balls in a T20I match.

References

External links
 

1999 births
Living people
Irish cricketers
Ireland One Day International cricketers
Ireland Twenty20 International cricketers
South African cricketers
Cricketers from Johannesburg
Leinster Lightning cricketers
Munster Reds cricketers
Twenty20 International hat-trick takers